The Omloop der drie Provinciën was a Belgian post-WW II cycling race organized for the last time in 1982.

The course, variating between 185 and 225 km always ended in Avelgem, West Flanders.

The competition's roll of honor includes the successes of Rik Van Steenbergen, Briek Schotte and Walter Godefroot.

Winners

References 

Cycle races in Belgium
1947 establishments in Belgium
Defunct cycling races in Belgium
Recurring sporting events established in 1947
Recurring sporting events disestablished in 1982
1982 disestablishments in Belgium